Road Rage (known as Speed King NEO KOBE 2045/Speed King in Japan) is a 3D cyberpunk themed racing game by Konami released for arcades in 1995 and on the PlayStation in 1996/1997 (depending on the distribution region). While the arcade version was released worldwide, the PlayStation port was only released in Japan and Europe. The European PlayStation version of the game is considered obscure and very rare the same can be said for the arcade cabinets due to their elusive status.

The game contains references to a large number of other Konami games (Gradius, Parodius, Metal Gear, Snatcher, Frogger, etc.). The races themselves take place in the city of Neo Kobe (known from Konami's Snatcher), inspired by the movie Blade Runner. The gameplay is similar to the better-known futuristic racing series Wipeout. In order to approximate the authentic gameplay of the original arcade version, the PlayStation port features support for the NeGcon analog controller.

See also 
 Road Fighter

:ja:スピードキング NEO KOBE 2045

References 

1995 video games
Konami games
PlayStation (console) games
Racing video games
Single-player video games